Joachim Hunger (26 September 1957 – 9 February 1990) was a German sailor. He competed at the 1984 Summer Olympics and the 1988 Summer Olympics.

References

External links
 

1957 births
1990 deaths
German male sailors (sport)
Olympic sailors of West Germany
Sailors at the 1984 Summer Olympics – 470
Sailors at the 1988 Summer Olympics – 470
Sportspeople from Kiel